Claus Owrén Høyer (17 March 1891 – 2 November 1964) was a Norwegian rower who competed in the 1912 Summer Olympics.

He was the bowman of the Norwegian boat that won the bronze medal in the coxed four, inriggers.

References

External links
profile

1891 births
1964 deaths
Norwegian male rowers
Olympic rowers of Norway
Rowers at the 1912 Summer Olympics
Olympic bronze medalists for Norway
Olympic medalists in rowing
Medalists at the 1912 Summer Olympics